Patricia Coco (born 12 February 1991) is a Spanish sprint canoeist.

She competed at the 2021 ICF Canoe Sprint World Championships, winning a gold medal in the C-2 200 m distance.

References

External links

1991 births
Living people
Spanish female canoeists
ICF Canoe Sprint World Championships medalists in Canadian
21st-century Spanish women